"The Sound of Your Cry" is a song written by Bernie Baum, Bill Giant and Florence Kaye and originally recorded and released by Elvis Presley.

It reached number 19 on the Billboard Easy Listening chart in 1971 (as a double A-side with "It's Only Love").

Composition 
The song was written by Bernie Baum, Bill Giant and Florence Kaye.

Recording 
Presley recorded the song on June 4, 1970, at RCA's Studio B in Nashville.

Track listing

Charts

References

External links 
 

 It's Only Love / The Sound Of Your Cry on the official Elvis Presley website

1971 songs
1971 singles
Elvis Presley songs
RCA Records singles
Songs written by Bernie Baum
Songs written by Bill Giant
Songs written by Florence Kaye